This is a summary of 1948 in music in the United Kingdom.

Events
10 January – The Amadeus Quartet (formed as the Brainin Quartet in 1947) gives its first recital under this name, at the Wigmore Hall in London, underwritten by Imogen Holst.
16 January – The day after her New York concert debut, Kathleen Ferrier writes to her sister: "Some of the critics are enthusiastic, others unimpressed". 
17 April – The death of Alice, Viscountess Wimborne, lover of William Walton, ends their 14-year affair.
21 April
Ralph Vaughan Williams' Symphony No. 6 is premiered by the BBC Symphony Orchestra conducted by Sir Adrian Boult at the Royal Albert Hall in London and broadcast on the BBC Home Service.
The National Youth Orchestra of Great Britain gives its first concert.
5 June – Opening of the first Aldeburgh Festival, founded by Benjamin Britten, Eric Crozier and Peter Pears.
13 October – Kathleen Ferrier joins Sir John Barbirolli and the Hallé Orchestra in a broadcast performance of Mahler's song cycle Kindertotenlieder.
October – The Duke of Edinburgh is introduced to musical comedy star Pat Kirkwood in her dressing room after a show.  They are seen together at a restaurant, creating a scandal in the newspapers.
13 October – William Walton marries Susana Gil Passo.
date unknown 
Steuart Wilson becomes head of music at the BBC; the appointment will result in the forced retirement of Sir Adrian Boult as chief conductor of the BBC Symphony Orchestra.
Harman Grisewood replaces George Barnes as controller of the BBC Third Programme.
The National School of Opera is founded by Joan Cross.

Popular music
Anne Shelton – "If You Ever Fall in Love Again" (Dick Farrelly)
Dorothy Squires – "A Tree in the Meadow" (Billy Reid)

Classical music: new works
Malcolm Arnold – The Smoke (Overture), Op. 21
Arnold Bax – Magnificat
Benjamin Britten – Saint Nicolas, for tenor soloist, children's chorus, chorus, and orchestra
Michael Tippett – Suite in D for the Birthday of Prince Charles
Ralph Vaughan Williams – Partita for Double String Orchestra

Opera
Arthur Bliss – The Olympians
Norman Demuth – Le Flambeau

Film and Incidental music
William Alwyn – The Fallen Idol directed by Carol Reed, starring Ralph Richardson.
Arnold Bax – Oliver Twist directed by David Lean, starring Alec Guinness.
Brian Easdale – The Red Shoes directed and produced by Michael Powell and Emeric Pressburger.
Constant Lambert – Anna Karenina, starring Vivien Leigh and Ralph Richardson.
Elisabeth Lutyens – Penny and the Pownall Case (the first feature film to be scored by a female British composer).
Ralph Vaughan Williams – Scott of the Antarctic, starring John Mills.
William Walton – Hamlet, directed by and starring Laurence Olivier.
John Wooldridge – The Guinea Pig, starring Richard Attenborough.

Musical theatre
10 March – Carissima, starring Ginger Rogers and David Hughes, opens at the Palace Theatre and runs for 488 performances.
22 December – High Button Shoes (Jule Styne and Sammy Cahn) opens at the Hippodrome and runs for 291 performances.

Musical films
A Date with a Dream, starring Terry-Thomas, Jeannie Carson and Wally Patch.
Bless 'Em All, starring Max Bygraves. 
One Night with You, directed by Terence Young and starring Nino Martini, Patricia Roc and Bonar Colleano.

Births
17 January – Mick Taylor, guitarist 
19 January – Amanda Holden, English playwright, lyricist and composer
3 February – Gavin Henderson, English trumpet player and conductor
28 February – Geoff Nicholls, keyboardist (Black Sabbath) (died 2017)
4 March – Chris Squire, guitarist and singer-songwriter
11 March – Jan Schelhaas, keyboard player 
22 March – Andrew Lloyd Webber, composer
16 April – Robert Kirby, arranger (died 2009) 
28 April – Scott Fitzgerald (William McPhail), singer
12 May – Steve Winwood, R&B singer 
15 May – Brian Eno, synthesizer virtuoso and composer
21 May – Leo Sayer, singer-songwriter
29 May – Michael Berkeley, composer
6 June – Richard Sinclair, bass player (Caravan, The Wilde Flowers, Camel and Hatfield and the North)
1 July – John Ford, English-American singer-songwriter and guitarist (Strawbs, The Monks and Elmer Gantry's Velvet Opera)
4 July – Jeremy Spencer, English guitarist (Fleetwood Mac)
5 July – Alan Hazeldine, pianist and conductor (died 2008)
21 July – Cat Stevens (Steven Demetre Georgiou), singer-songwriter 
2 August – Andy Fairweather Low, guitarist, songwriter, producer and vocalist
26 September – Olivia Newton-John, singer and actress
3 October – Ian MacDonald (Ian MacCormick), music critic (died 2003)
11 October – David Rendall, operatic tenor
24 October 
Dale Griffin, rock drummer and producer (died 2016)
Barry Ryan, singer-songwriter
Paul Ryan, singer-songwriter and producer (died 1992)
22 November – Mick Rock, rock photographer (died 2021)
3 November – Lulu (Marie McDonald McLaughlin Lawrie), singer and actress
1 December – Colin Sell, pianist
3 December – Ozzy Osbourne, singer-songwriter
20 December – Alan Parsons, engineer and record producer

Deaths
9 January – Violet Gordon-Woodhouse, harpsichordist and clavichordist, 75
21 February – Frederic Lamond, pianist, 80
17 May – David Evans, composer, 74
14 June – John Blackwood McEwen, composer, 80
8 July – Reginald Somerville, composer and actor, 81
20 August – David John de Lloyd, composer, 65
12 September – Rupert D'Oyly Carte, impresario, 70
20 November – Robert Carr, baritone, 67
24 November – Nellie Wallace, music hall star, actress, comedian, dancer and songwriter, 78
14 December – R. O. Morris, British composer and teacher, 62
31 December – Ethel Barns, violinist, pianist and composer, 74
date unknown – Euphemia Allen, composer best known for "Chopsticks"

See also
 1948 in British television
 1948 in the United Kingdom
 List of British films of 1948

References

 
British Music, 1948 In
British music by year